Hama Governorate ( / ALA-LC: Muḥāfaẓat Ḥamā) is one of the 14 governorates of Syria. It is situated in western-central Syria, bordering Idlib and Aleppo Governorates to the south, Raqqa Governorate to the west, Homs Governorate to the north, and Tartus and Latakia Governorate to the east. It is the only Governorate (excluding Damascus) that does not border a foreign country. Measures of its area vary from 8,844 km2 to 8,883 km2, with its capital being the city of Hama.

History

Archaeological sites
 Al Qubays - medieval castle
 Apamea - Graeco-Roman city
 Bourzey castle - Byzantine castle
 Masyaf Castle - medieval castle
 Shmemis - Ayyubid castle
 Tell Asharneh - possible site of Bronze Age Tunip
 Tell Qarqur - ancient settlement

Modern Syria
Hama has historically been a centre of opposition to the Assad regime, and it was the centre of an uprising in the late 1970s to the early 1980s that resulted in the 1982 Hama massacre.

Syrian Civil War
The city was one of several that saw anti-Assad protests in 2011, the violent suppression of which ultimately led to the outbreak of civil war. Despite this, for the most part the governorate has stayed under the Syrian Government's control, with exceptions of parts of the north-west in the early years of the conflict. The eastern desert regions of the governorate fell under the control of Islamic State of Iraq and the Levant by 2016, but by September 2017 the Syrian Army had managed to oust them.

Geography
The western regions of the governorate are part of the Syrian Coastal Mountain Range (Nusayriyah Mountains), running north to south. Roughly parallel with the mountains to the east is the Al-Ghab Plain, with the Orontes river flowing through it, Hama city lies on this river. The central and eastern regions of the governorate consists of flatter desert terrain.

Settlements
The provincial capital is Hama; other major settlements include Akakir, Al-Hamraa, Al Qastal, Al-Saan, Aqarib as Safi, At Tammazah, Ithriya, Kafr Buhum, Karnaz, Mahardah, Masyaf, Murak, Qalaat al-Madiq, Qasr Ibn Wardan, Sabburah, Salamiyah, Shaykh Hilal, Shaytalun, Suran and Tayyibat at Turki.

Districts

The governorate is divided into five districts (manatiq). The districts are further divided into 22 sub-districts (nawahi):

 Hama District (4 sub-districts)
 Hama Subdistrict
 Suran Subdistrict
 Hirbnafsah Subdistrict
 Al-Hamraa Subdistrict
 Masyaf District (5 sub-districts)
 Masyaf Subdistrict
 Jubb Ramlah Subdistrict
 Awj Subdistrict
 Ayn Halaqim Subdistrict
 Wadi al-Uyun Subdistrict
 Mahardah District (3 sub-districts; a.k.a. Mhardeh, Muhardeh)
 Mahardah Subdistrict
 Kafr Zita Subdistrict
 Karnaz Subdistrict

 Salamiyah District (5 sub-districts)
 Salamiyah Subdistrict
 Barri Sharqi Subdistrict
 Al-Saan Subdistrict
 Sabburah Subdistrict
 Uqayribat Subdistrict
 Al-Suqaylabiyah District (5 sub-districts)
 Al-Suqaylabiyah Subdistrict
 Tell Salhab Subdistrict
 Al-Ziyarah Subdistrict
 Shathah Subdistrict
 Qalaat al-Madiq Subdistrict

Economy
Agriculture dominates the labor force of Hama Governorate, with 48% of employment occurring within this sector. The remaining employment is spread between industry (22%) and trade and other services (30%). The main agricultural crops are wheat, barley, cotton, beetroot, onion, tobacco, and various vegetables. Fruit trees such as olive, pistachio, apple, pear, plum and peach are also commonly grown here. Animal breeding of sheep, goats, poultry and bees are prevalent in Hama.

Between 1926–1949, Hama witnessed developments in its public sector with industry expanding on sugar plants, onion drying, oils manufacturing, cotton grinning factories, and cement production and processing. Other manufacturing industry that was expanded include soda, ice cream, candy, textile, wool, cotton, rugs, carpets, gowns, and horse saddles. The region is also Syria's center of its chemical and manufacturing industry.

Demographics 
As per the 2004 Syrian census the population was 1,385,000. A 2011 UNOCHA estimate put the population at 1,628,000, though this has likely changed since the start of the war.

Sunni Muslims form the majority at 61%, followed by Alawites (19%), Ismailis (12%), Christian (7%) and Shi'ite Muslims (1%).

Gallery

References

External links
ehama The First Complete website for hama news and services

 
Governorates of Syria